is a city located in the southwest of Kōchi Prefecture, Japan. , the city had an estimated population of 12,407 in 7004 households, and a population density of 47 persons per km².

Geography
Tosashimizu is located in far western Kochi Prefecture on the island of Shikoku.  Parts of the city are within the borders of the Ashizuri-Uwakai National Park.

Neighbouring municipalities 
Kōchi Prefecture
 Sukumo
 Shimanto City
  Ōtsuki
 Mihara

Climate
Tosashimizu has a humid subtropical climate (Köppen climate classification Cfa) with hot, humid summers and cool winters. There is significant precipitation throughout the year, especially during June and July.

Demographics
Per Japanese census data, the population of Tosashimizu in 2020 is 12,388 people. Tosashimizu has been conducting censuses since 1920. Of the 11 cities in Kochi Prefecture, Tosashimizu has the second lowest population which was over 30,000 in 1954 compared to 14,937 as of March 31, 2015.

History 
As with all of Kōchi Prefecture, the area of Tosashimizu was part of ancient Tosa Province.  During the Edo period, the area was part of the holdings of Tosa Domain ruled by the Yamauchi clan from their seat at Kōchi Castle. Following the Meiji restoration, the village of Shimatsu (清松村) within Hata District, Kōchi was established with the creation of the modern municipalities system on April 1, 1889. It changed its name to Shimizu and was elevated to town status in 1924. On August 1, 1954, Shimizu merged with the neighboring towns of Shimokawaguchi, Misaki and Shimokae to form the city of Tosashimizu.

Government
Tosashimizu has a mayor-council form of government with a directly elected mayor and a unicameral city council of 12 members. Tosashimizu contributes one member to the Kōchi Prefectural Assembly. In terms of national politics, the city is part of Kōchi 2nd district of the lower house of the Diet of Japan.

Tosashimizu is the only city on Shikoku island that hosts a Japan Air Self-Defense Force (ASDF) base.

Economy
The largest industry is fishing, especially deep-sea fishing. Sōdabushi, locally called mejikabushi, is one of the main seafood produce in the area with a market share of approximately 70%. It uses sōdagatsuo (frigate mackerel) and is manufactured using a similar process to katsuobushi. The local fishermen's union registered their catch of blue mackerel Scomber australasicus as "Tosano shimizusaba", or blue mackerel of Shimizu, Tosa.

Osaka Aquarium Kaiyukan has a branch in Tosashimizu, and Osaka Aquarium Biological Research Institute of Iburi Center (OBIC) provides one third of those marine animals displayed at the aquarium in Osaka. The center conducts scientific studies at its facility including a 1,600 ton tank.

Education
Tosashimizu has six public elementary schools and one public middle school operated by the city government, and one public high school operated by the Kōchi Prefectural Board of Education.

Transportation

Railway
Tosashimizu has no passenger railway services. The nearest train station is Nakamura Station, the terminus of the Tosa Kuroshio Railway Nakamura Line, located in Shimanto city. A bus service connects Tosashimizu with Nakamura Station, taking approximately 60 minutes.

Highway

Sister cities
  Fairhaven, Massachusetts, United States, since 1987
  New Bedford, Massachusetts, United States, since 1987
  Tomigusuku, Okinawa, since February 1993.

Local attractions

Cape Ashizuri
The 70 km coastline stretching from the northeast to southwest boundaries of Tosashimizu attracts over 800,000 tourists to Tosashimizu each year. Ashizuri-Uwakai National Park includes Ashizuri, the largest peninsula in the area. Tosashimizu is the nearest city to Ashizuri peninsula which is protruding into the Pacific Ocean. Cape Ashizuri is 80 meters above sea level at the southeastern end on the peninsula. The peninsula is covered by subtropical plants including camellia, holm oak, and colony of Livistona Livistona chinensis, and the sea is a prime fishing ground for katsuo fish, or skipjack tuna Katsuwonus pelamis.

Tatsukushi geologic strata with layers of sandstone and mudstone form joints and layers. A gate-like rock on the coast, Hakusandōmon is on the west side of the cape. Tōjindaba Site is a prehistoric megalithic site with stone circle, located on the west hill on Cape Ashizuri.

Birthplace of Nakahama Manjirō
On the western shore of Ashizuri peninsula, lies the village of Nakanohama within Tosashimizu, where Nakahama Manjirō was born and became one of the first Japanese to travel to the United States. Manjirō, a young fisherman, was shipwrecked off the coast of Japan in 1841 and rescued by whaling captain William H. Whitfield of Fairhaven, Massachusetts. Whitfield brought the young Manjirō back to Fairhaven and New Bedford at the end of the whaling voyage, and Manjirō spent several years there before eventually making his way back to Japan. Because of this history, Tosashimizu became the sister city of both Fairhaven and New Bedford in 1987. He became popular as John Manjirō after Ibuse Masuji depicted him in his novel John Manjiro. The Castaway: His Life and His Adventures.

Wildlife tours
There are several wildlife tours popular on Ashizuri peninsula; wildlife swims are organized in the town of Iburi on the foot of Ashizuri peninsula.

Whale shark swim
Whale sharks migrate off the Ashizuri Peninsula between June and September, and some are kept captive in a cage 300 m offshore.

Ocean sunfish swim
Between April and the end of July each year, ocean sunfish are kept in a net cage 10 m by 10 m and 5 m deep. When the water temperature rises, they release the fish into the wild.

Whale watching
Whale watching is also offered on the east side of the peninsula, based at Kubotsu town to the middle and Shimonokae to the north.

The Shikoku Pilgrimage 
The Shikoku Pilgrimage passes through the city, and the longest stretch of 80.7 km on the route is between the 37th temple in Shimanto and the 38th temple on Cape Ashizuri. It was designated to provide a free lodging for pilgrims on that section, where people could also leave their luggage while visiting Kongōfuku-ji, come back to Shinnenan and continue on to the 39th Enkō-ji in Sukumo 50.8 km away.

Roadside stations
Mejikano sato Tosashimizu roadside station is near scenic Tatsukushi along route 321. Mejika means sōdagatsuo (frigate mackerel) in the local dialect, and they manufacture and sell sōdabushi, the main sea food produce of the city, processed for demonstration at the factory at the back of the store for direct selling. Farm produce is also sold at this roadside station.

References

External links

 
 City office, Tosashimizu city 
 Tosashimizu Tourist Association 
 Shikoku Pilgrimage in Kochi - official website for Shikoku Hachijū-hakkasho Reijokai  

 

Cities in Kōchi Prefecture
Port settlements in Japan
Populated coastal places in Japan